The 2021 Seattle Mariners season was the 45th season in franchise history. The Mariners played their 22nd full season (23rd overall) at T-Mobile Park, their home ballpark in Seattle, Washington. The M's entered this season with the longest active playoff drought in the four major North American professional sports leagues, attempting to make their first postseason in twenty years. Seattle is the only current Major League Baseball (MLB) franchise without a World Series appearance. Despite posting a 90–72 record, their best since the 2003 season, the Mariners were eliminated from postseason contention for the 20th consecutive season after a loss to the Angels, and both the Yankees and Red Sox clinched the two wild card spots on the last day of the season. This season was the second time during their drought that they’d won two more regular season games than the World Series champions.

Regular season
As that game featured a home run, a double, and a single, and the Mariners/Dodgers games featured just a double and two singles, it broke the record for fewest total bases in a regular-season interleague game.

Standings

American League West

American League Playoff Standings

Record against opponents

Game log

|- style="background:#bfb;"
| 1 || April 1 || Giants || 8–7  || Misiewicz (1–0) || Álvarez (0–1) || — || 8,174 || 1–0 || W1
|- style="background:#fbb;"
| 2 || April 2 || Giants || 3–6 || Peralta (1–0) || Steckenrider (0–1) || McGee (1) || 8,392 || 1–1 || L1
|- style="background:#bfb;"
| 3 || April 3 || Giants || 4–0 || Flexen (1–0) || Webb (0–1) || Montero (1) || 8,651 || 2–1 || W1
|- style="background:#fbb;"
| 4 || April 5 || White Sox || 0–6 || Rodón (1–0) || Sheffield (0–1) || — || 6,436 || 2–2 || L1
|- style="background:#fbb;"
| 5 || April 6 || White Sox || 4–10 || Giolito (1–0) || Margevicius (0–1) || — || 7,980 || 2–3 || L2
|- style="background:#bfb;"
| 6 || April 7 || White Sox || 8–4 || Vest (1–0) || Foster (0–1) || — || 7,429 || 3–3 || W1
|- style="background:#fbb;"
| 7 || April 8 || @ Twins || 2–10 || Berríos (2–0) || Gonzales (0–1) || — || 9,675 || 3–4 || L2
|- style="background:#bfb;"
| 8 || April 10 || @ Twins || 4–3  || Graveman (1–0) || Rogers (0–1) || Middleton (1) || 9,817 || 4–4 || W1
|- style="background:#bfb;"
| 9 || April 11 || @ Twins || 8–6 || Steckenrider (1–1) || Colomé (0–1) || Montero (2) || 9,792 || 5–4 || W2
|- style="background:#bbb;"
| – || April 12 || @ Orioles || colspan=7| Postponed (Rain, makeup: April 13)
|- style="background:#bfb;"
| 10 || April 13  || @ Orioles || 4–3  || Montero (1–0) || Scott (0–1) || Graveman (1) || N/A || 6–4 || W3
|- style="background:#fbb;"
| 11 || April 13  || @ Orioles || 6–7  || Valdez (2–0) || Sadler (0–1) || — || 4,147 || 6–5 || L1
|- style="background:#bbb;"
| – || April 14 || @ Orioles || colspan=7| Postponed (Rain, makeup: April 15)
|- style="background:#bfb;"
| 12 || April 15  || @ Orioles || 4–2  || Gonzales (1–1) || Scott (0–2) || Graveman (2) || N/A || 7–5 || W1
|- style="background:#bfb;"
| 13 || April 15  || @ Orioles || 2–1  || Dunn (1–0) || Zimmermann (1–1) || Middleton (2) || 5,060 || 8–5 || W2
|- style="background:#bfb;"
| 14 || April 16 || Astros || 6–5 || Misiewicz (2–0) || Stanek (0–1) || — || 8,967 || 9–5 || W3
|- style="background:#fbb;"
| 15 || April 17 || Astros || 0–1 || Greinke (2–1) || Flexen (1–1) || Pressly (1) || 8,960 || 9–6 || L1
|- style="background:#bfb;"
| 16 || April 18 || Astros || 7–2 || Newsome (1–0) || Odorizzi (0–2) || — || 8,959 || 10–6 || W1
|- style="background:#bfb;"
| 17 || April 19 || Dodgers || 4–3 || Sheffield (1–1) || May (1–1) || Montero (3) || 8,999 || 11–6 || W2
|- style="background:#fbb;"
| 18 || April 20 || Dodgers || 0–1 || Urías (3–0) || Gonzales (1–2) || Jansen (4) || 8,998 || 11–7 || L1
|- style="background:#bfb;"
| 19 || April 22 || @ Red Sox || 7–3  || Montero (2–0) || Hernández (0–1) || — || 4,617 || 12–7 || W1
|- style="background:#fbb;"
| 20 || April 23 || @ Red Sox || 5–6 || Sawamura (1–0) || Kikuchi (0–1) || — || 4,646 || 12–8 || L1
|- style="background:#bfb;"
| 21 || April 24 || @ Red Sox || 8–2 || Flexen (2–1) || Eovaldi (3–2) || — || 4,621 || 13–8 || W1
|- style="background:#fbb;"
| 22 || April 25 || @ Red Sox || 3–5 || Rodríguez (4–0) || Margevicius (0–2) || Barnes (4) || 4,510 || 13–9 || L1
|- style="background:#fbb;"
| 23 || April 26 || @ Astros || 2–5 || Urquidy (1–2) || Sheffield (1–2) || Pressly (2) || 11,862 || 13–10 || L2
|- style="background:#fbb;"
| 24 || April 27 || @ Astros || 0–2 || Javier (3–0) || Gonzales (1–3) || Pressly (3) || 14,413 || 13–11 || L3
|- style="background:#fbb;"
| 25 || April 28 || @ Astros || 5–7 || Smith (1–1) || Montero (2–1) || Stanek (1) || 12,707 || 13–12 || L4
|- style="background:#bfb;"
| 26 || April 29 || @ Astros || 1–0 || Kikuchi (1–1) || García (0–3) || Graveman (3) || 14,149 || 14–12 || W1
|- style="background:#bfb;"
| 27 || April 30 || Angels || 7–4 || Steckenrider (2–1) || Heaney (1–2) || — || 8,632 || 15–12 || W2
|-

|- style="background:#fbb;"
| 28 || May 1 || Angels || 5–10 || Canning (2–2) || Newsome (1–1) || — || 8,993 || 15–13 || L1
|- style="background:#bfb;"
| 29 || May 2 || Angels || 2–0 || Sheffield (2–2) || Bundy (0–3) || Montero (4) || 9,000 || 16–13 || W1
|- style="background:#fbb;"
| 30 || May 3 || Orioles || 3–5 || Sulser (1–0) || Misiewicz (2–1) || Valdez (7) || 5,776 || 16–14 || L1
|- style="background:#bfb;"
| 31 || May 4 || Orioles || 5–2 || Montero (3–1) || Lakins (1–3) || — || 6,504 || 17–14 || W1
|- style="background:#fbb;"
| 32 || May 5 || Orioles || 0–6 || Means (4–0) || Kikuchi (1–2) || — || 6,742 || 17–15 || L1
|- style="background:#bfb;"
| 33 || May 7 || @ Rangers || 5–4 || Flexen (3–1) || Sborz (3–2) || Graveman (4) || 26,047 || 18–15 || W1
|- style="background:#fbb;"
| 34 || May 8 || @ Rangers || 8–9 || King (4–1) || Misiewicz (2–2) || Kennedy (10) || 26,616 || 18–16 || L1
|- style="background:#fbb;"
| 35 || May 9 || @ Rangers || 2–10 || Dunning (2–2) || Sheffield (2–3) || — || 30,632 || 18–17 || L2
|- style="background:#fbb;"
| 36 || May 11 || @ Dodgers || 4–6 || Cleavinger (1–3) || Montero (3–2) || Jansen (6) || 15,570 || 18–18 || L3
|- style="background:#fbb;"
| 37 || May 12 || @ Dodgers || 1–7 || Urías (5–1) || Dunn (1–1) || — || 15,586 || 18–19 || L4
|- style="background:#fbb;"
| 38 || May 13 || Indians || 2–4 || Plesac (3–3) || Gilbert (0–1) || Shaw (1) || 9,880 || 18–20 || L5
|- style="background:#bfb;"
| 39 || May 14 || Indians || 7–3 || Flexen (4–1) || Civale (5–1) || Montero (5) || 10,014 || 19–20 || W1
|- style="background:#bfb;"
| 40 || May 15 || Indians || 7–3 || Sheffield (3–3) || McKenzie (1–2) || — || 10,311 || 20–20 || W2
|- style="background:#bfb;"
| 41 || May 16 || Indians || 3–2 || Sewald (1–0) || Bieber (4–3) || Graveman (5) || 10,287 || 21–20 || W3
|- style="background:#fbb;"
| 42 || May 17 || Tigers || 1–4 || Mize (3–3) || Kikuchi (1–3) || Fulmer (3) || 7,201 || 21–21 || L1
|- style="background:#fbb;"
| 43 || May 18 || Tigers || 0–5 || Turnbull (3–2) || Dunn (1–2) || — || 6,883 || 21–22 || L2
|- style="background:#fbb;"
| 44 || May 19 || Tigers || 2–6 || Skubal (1–6) || Gilbert (0–2) || — || 8.462 || 21–23 || L3
|- style="background:#fbb;"
| 45 || May 21 || @ Padres || 1–16 || Paddack (2–3) || Flexen (4–2) || — || 15,250 || 21–24 || L4
|- style="background:#fbb;"
| 46 || May 22 || @ Padres || 4–6 || Stammen (3–1) || Sheffield (3–4) || Melancon (16) || 15,250 || 21–25 || L5
|- style="background:#fbb;"
| 47 || May 23 || @ Padres || 2–9 || Darvish (5–1) || Misiewicz (2–3) || — || 15,250 || 21–26 || L6
|- style="background:#bfb;"
| 48 || May 24 || @ Athletics || 4–2 || Kikuchi (2–3) || Montas (5–4) || Middleton (3) || 3,019 || 22–26 || W1
|- style="background:#bfb;"
| 49 || May 25 || @ Athletics || 4–3 || Sewald (2–0) || Irvin (3–6) || Montero (6) || 2,865 || 23–26 || W2
|- style="background:#fbb;"
| 50 || May 26 || @ Athletics || 3–6 || Kaprielian (2–0) || Dugger (0–1) || Diekman (6) || 3,571 || 23–27 || L1
|- style="background:#bfb;"
| 51 || May 27 || Rangers || 5–0 || Flexen (5–2) || Allard (1–1) || — || 9,008 || 24–27 || W1
|- style="background:#bfb;"
| 52 || May 28 || Rangers || 3–2 || Sheffield (4–4) || Lyles (2–4) || Swanson (1) || 10,605 || 25–27 || W2
|- style="background:#bfb;"
| 53 || May 29 || Rangers || 3–2 || Zamora (1–0) || Foltynewicz (1–5) || Montero (7) || 11,071 || 26–27 || W3
|- style="background:#bfb;"
| 54 || May 30 || Rangers || 4–2 || Kikuchi (3–3) || Yang (0–3) || Middleton (4) || 11,198 || 27–27 || W4
|- style="background:#bfb;"
| 55 || May 31 || Athletics || 6–5  || Zamora (2–0) || Trivino (2–2) || — || 11,112 || 28–27 || W5
|-

|- style="background:#fbb;"
| 56 || June 1 || Athletics || 6–12 || Luzardo (2–3) || Sewald (2–1) || — || 9,160 || 28–28 || L1
|- style="background:#fbb;"
| 57 || June 2 || Athletics || 0–6 || Manaea (4–2) || Flexen (5–3) || — || 9,588 || 28–29 || L2
|- style="background:#bfb;"
| 58 || June 3 || @ Angels || 6–2 || Sheffield (5–4) || Canning (4–4) || — || 9,714 || 29–29 || W1
|- style="background:#fbb;"
| 59 || June 4 || @ Angels || 2–3 || Ohtani (2–1) || Santiago (0–1) || Iglesias (10) || 15,141 || 29–30 || L1
|- style="background:#fbb;"
| 60 || June 5 || @ Angels || 5–12 || Cobb (4–2) || Steckenrider (2–2) || — || 15,071 || 29–31 || L2
|- style="background:#bfb;"
| 61 || June 6 || @ Angels || 9–5 || Gilbert (1–2) || Sandoval (0–2) || — || 12,833 || 30–31 || W1
|- style="background:#fbb;"
| 62 || June 8 || @ Tigers || 3–5 || Boyd (3–6) || Gonzales (1–4) || Cisnero (2) || 9,081 || 30–32 || L1
|- style="background:#bfb;"
| 63 || June 9 || @ Tigers || 9–6  || Chargois (1–0) || Norris (0–2) || — || 9,162 || 31–32 || W1
|- style="background:#fbb;"
| 64 || June 10 || @ Tigers || 3–8 || Jiménez (1–0) || Sheffield (5–5) || — || 9,290 || 31–33 || L1
|- style="background:#fbb;"
| 65 || June 11 || @ Indians || 0–7 || Civale (9–2) || Dunn (1–3) || — || 22,970 || 31–34 || L2
|- style="background:#fbb;"
| 66 || June 12 || @ Indians || 4–5  || Karinchak (3–2) || Sewald (2–2) || — || 20,116 || 31–35 || L3
|- style="background:#bfb;"
| 67 || June 13 || @ Indians || 6–2 || Gilbert (2–2) || Bieber (7–4) || — || 17,371 || 32–35 || W1
|- style="background:#bfb;"
| 68 || June 14 || Twins || 4–3 || Sewald (3–2) || Robles (2–3) || Steckenrider (1) || 9,185 || 33–35 || W2
|- style="background:#bfb;"
| 69 || June 15 || Twins || 10–0 || Flexen (6–3) || Happ (3–3) || — || 7,669 || 34–35 || W3
|- style="background:#fbb;"
| 70 || June 16 || Twins || 2–7 || Thielbar (1–0) || Sheffield (5–6) || — || 8,098 || 34–36 || L1
|- style="background:#bfb;"
| 71 || June 17 || Rays || 6–5 || Santiago (1–1) || Fairbanks (1–2) || — || 9,092 || 35–36 || W1
|- style="background:#bfb;"
| 72 || June 18 || Rays || 5–1 || Kikuchi (4–3) || Wacha (1–2) || — || 12,654 || 36–36 || W2
|- style="background:#bfb;"
| 73 || June 19 || Rays || 6–5  || Montero (4–2) || Feyereisen (3–3) || — || 14,772 || 37–36 || W3
|- style="background:#bfb;"
| 74 || June 20 || Rays || 6–2  || Montero (5–2) || Castillo (2–4) || — || 18,172 || 38–36 || W4
|- style="background:#bfb;"
| 75 || June 22 || Rockies || 2–1 || Sewald (4–2) || Kinley (1–2) || Graveman (6) || 12,879 || 39–36 || W5
|- style="background:#fbb;"
| 76 || June 23 || Rockies || 2–5 || Márquez (6–6) || Sheffield (5–7) || Bard (10) || 11,141 || 39–37 || L1
|- style="background:#bfb;"
| 77 || June 25 || @ White Sox || 9–3 || Kikuchi (5–3) || Rodón (6–3) || — || 32,189 || 40–37 || W1
|- style="background:#bbb;" 
| — || June 26 || @ White Sox || colspan=7| Suspended (Rain, continuation: June 27)
|- style="background:#bfb;"
| 78 || June 27  || @ White Sox || 3–2 || Sewald (5–2) || Hendriks (3–2) || Graveman (7) || 30,017 || 41–37 || W2
|- style="background:#fbb;"
| 79 || June 27  || @ White Sox || 5–7  || Bummer (1–4) || Dugger (0–2) || Hendriks (20) || 30,017 || 41–38 || L1
|- style="background:#fbb;"
| 80 || June 29 || @ Blue Jays || 3–9 || Ray (6–3) || Montero (5–3) || — || 6,736 || 41–39 || L2
|- style="background:#bfb;"
| 81 || June 30 || @ Blue Jays || 9–7  || Graveman (2–0) || Murphy (0–1) || Steckenrider (2) || 6,632 || 42–39 || W1
|-

|- style="background:#bfb;"
| 82 || July 1 || @ Blue Jays || 7–2 || Kikuchi (6–3) || Ryu (7–5) || Sewald (1) || 5,456 || 43–39 || W2
|- style="background:#bfb;"
| 83 || July 2 || Rangers || 5–4  || Misiewicz (3–3)  || Hearn (2–3) || — || 28,638 || 44–39 || W3
|- style="background:#fbb;"
| 84 || July 3 || Rangers || 3–7 || Lyles (4–5) || Gonzales (1–5) || — || 16,046 || 44–40 || L1
|- style="background:#bfb;"
| 85 || July 4 || Rangers || 4–1 || Flexen (7–3) || Foltynewicz (2–8) || Graveman (8) || 15,146 || 45–40 || W1
|- style="background:#fbb;"
| 86 || July 6 || Yankees || 1–12 || Taillon (4–4) || Sheffield (5–8) || — || 16,547 || 45–41 || L1
|- style="background:#fbb;"
| 87 || July 7 || Yankees || 4–5 || Cessa (2–1) || Kikuchi (6–4) || Green (3) || 17,205 || 45–42 || L2
|- style="background:#bfb;"
| 88 || July 8 || Yankees || 4–0 || Gilbert (3–2) || Montgomery (3–4) || — || 17,524 || 46–42 || W1
|- style="background:#bfb;"
| 89 || July 9 || Angels || 7–3 || Steckenrider (3–2) || Mayers (2–4) || — || 20,381 || 47–42 || W2
|- style="background:#bfb;"
| 90 || July 10 || Angels || 2–0 || Flexen (8–3) || Sandoval (2–3) || Sewald (2) || 27,353 || 48–42 || W3
|- style="background:#fbb;"
| 91 || July 11 || Angels || 1–7 || Suárez (4–2) || Ramírez (0–1) || Iglesias (19) || 23,348 || 48–43 || L1
|-style=background:#bbbfff
| – || July 13 || colspan="8"|91st All-Star Game in Denver, CO
|- style="background:#bfb;"
| 92 || July 16 || @ Angels || 6–5 || Flexen (9–3) || Heaney (5–7) || Sewald (3) || 40,880 || 49–43 || W1
|- style="background:#fbb;"
| 93 || July 17 || @ Angels || 4–9 || Cobb (7–3) || Kikuchi (6–5) || — || 28,927 || 49–44 || L1
|- style="background:#bfb;"
| 94 || July 18 || @ Angels || 7–4 || Gilbert (4–2) || Sandoval (2–4) || — || 23,434 || 50–44 || W1
|- style="background:#bfb;"
| 95 || July 20 || @ Rockies || 6–4 || Gonzales (2–5) || Márquez (8–7) || Graveman (9) || 30,715 || 51–44 || W2
|- style="background:#fbb;"
| 96 || July 21 || @ Rockies || 3–6 || Gomber (7–5) || Middleton (0–1) || Bard (15) || 25,053 || 51–45 || L1
|- style="background:#fbb;"
| 97 || July 22 || Athletics || 1–4 || Manaea (7–6) || Flexen (9–4) || Trivino (16) || 18,553 || 51–46 || L2
|- style="background:#bfb;"
| 98 || July 23 || Athletics || 4–3 || Sewald (6–2) || Diekman (2–2) || Graveman (10) || 21,312 || 52–46 || W1
|- style="background:#bfb;"
| 99 || July 24 || Athletics || 5–4 || Graveman (3–0) || Trivino (3–4) || — || 30,843 || 53–46 || W2
|- style="background:#bfb;"
| 100 || July 25 || Athletics || 4–3 || Gonzales (3–5) || Irvin (7–9) || Steckenrider (3) || 21,501 || 54–46 || W3
|- style="background:#bfb;"
| 101 || July 26 || Astros || 11–8 || Graveman (4–0) || Stanek (1–2) || Sewald (4) || 15,162 || 55–46 || W4
|- style="background:#fbb;"
| 102 || July 27 || Astros || 6–8 || McCullers Jr. (8–2) || Flexen (9–5) || — || 18,930 || 55–47 || L1
|- style="background:#fbb;"
| 103 || July 28 || Astros || 4–11 || Odorizzi (4–5) || Kikuchi (6–6) || — || 18,908 || 55–48 || L2
|- style="background:#bfb;"
| 104 || July 30 || @ Rangers || 9–5 || Gilbert (5–2) || Allard (2–9) || — || 27,542 || 56–48 || W1
|- style="background:#fbb;"
| 105 || July 31 || @ Rangers || 4–5  || Patton (1–1) || Castillo (2–5) || — || 33,463 || 56–49 || L1
|-

|- style="background:#fbb;"
| 106 || August 1 || @ Rangers || 3–4 || Santana (1–1) || Swanson (0–1) || — || 23,664 || 56–50 || L2
|- style="background:#bfb;"
| 107 || August 2 || @ Rays || 8–2 || Flexen (10–5) || Wacha (2–3) || — || 5,855 || 57–50 || W1
|- style="background:#bfb;"
| 108 || August 3 || @ Rays || 4–2 || Kikuchi (7–6) || Patiño (2–3) || Castillo (15) || 10,071 || 58–50 || W2
|- style="background:#fbb;”
| 109 || August 4 || @ Rays || 3–4 || Fleming (9–5) || Gilbert (5–3) || Sherriff (1) || 9,701 || 58–51 || L1
|- style="background:#fbb;"
| 110 || August 5 || @ Yankees || 3–5 || Green (5–5) || Sewald (6–3) || Chapman (23) || 33,211 || 58–52 || L2
|- style="background:#fbb;"
| 111 || August 6 || @ Yankees || 2–3  || Abreu (1–0) || Middleton (0–2) || — || 43,180 || 58–53 || L3
|- style="background:#fbb;"
| 112 || August 7 || @ Yankees || 4–5 || Heaney (7–8) || Misiewicz (3–4) || Loáisiga (4) || 35,165 || 58–54 || L4
|- style="background:#bfb;"
| 113 || August 8 || @ Yankees || 2–0 || Sewald (7–3) || Luetge (4–2) || Steckenrider (4) || 35,437 || 59–54 || W1
|- style="background:#fbb;"
| 114 || August 10 || Rangers || 4–5  || Martin (3–3) || Swanson (0–2) || — || 15,412 || 59–55 || L1
|- style="background:#bfb;"
| 115 || August 11 || Rangers || 2–1 || Steckenrider (4–2) || Santana (1–2) || — || 15,789 || 60–55 || W1
|- style="background:#bfb;"
| 116 || August 12 || Rangers || 3–1 || Gonzales (4–5) || Foltynewicz (2–11) || — || 14,031 || 61–55 || W2
|- style="background:#bfb;"
| 117 || August 13 || Blue Jays || 3–2 || Steckenrider (5–2) || Cimber (2–4) || — || 28,207 || 62–55 || W3
|- style="background:#bfb;"
| 118 || August 14 || Blue Jays || 9–3 || Middleton (1–2) || Ryu (11–6) || — || 26,090 || 63–55 || W4
|- style="background:#fbb;"
| 119 || August 15 || Blue Jays || 3–8 || Matz (10–7) || Gilbert (5–4) || — || 22,679 || 63–56 || L1
|- style="background:#bfb;"
| 120 || August 17 || @ Rangers || 3–1 || Anderson (6–8) || Hearn (2–4) || Sewald (5) || 15,140 || 64–56 || W1
|- style="background:#bfb;"
| 121 || August 18 || @ Rangers || 3–1 || Gonzales (5–5) || Foltynewicz (2–12) || Steckenrider (5) || 19,119 || 65–56 || W2
|- style="background:#bfb;"
| 122 || August 19 || @ Rangers || 9–8  || Smith (2–1) || Barlow (0–1) || Sewald (6) || 16,391 || 66–56 || W3
|- style="background:#fbb;"
| 123 || August 20 || @ Astros || 3–12 || McCullers Jr. (10–4) || Kikuchi (7–7) || — || 26,899 || 66–57 || L1
|- style="background:#fbb;"
| 124 || August 21 || @ Astros || 1–15 || Odorizzi (6–6) || Gilbert (5–5) || — || 29,908 || 66–58 || L2
|- style="background:#bfb;"
| 125 || August 22 || @ Astros || 6–3  || Sewald (8–3) || Stanek (1–3) || Ramírez (1) || 27,526 || 67–58 || W1
|- style="background:#bfb;"
| 126 || August 23 || @ Athletics || 5–3 || Misiewicz (4–4) || Trivino (5–6) || Sewald (7) || 4,140 || 68–58 || W2
|- style="background:#bfb;"
| 127 || August 24 || @ Athletics || 5–1 || Flexen (11–5) || Irvin (9–12) || Steckenrider (6) || 4,508 || 69–58 || W3
|- style="background:#fbb;"
| 128 || August 26 || Royals || 4–6 || Santana (1–1) || Smith (2–2) || Barlow (9) || 16,882 || 69–59 || L1
|- style="background:#fbb;"
| 129 || August 27 || Royals || 7–8  || Staumont (3–2) || Ramírez (0–2) || — || 22,953 || 69–60 || L2
|- style="background:#fbb;"
| 130 || August 28 || Royals || 2–4 || Payamps (1–3) || Anderson (6–9) || Barlow (10) || 24,575 || 69–61 || L3
|- style="background:#bfb;"
| 131 || August 29 || Royals || 4–3 || Gonzales (6–5) || Zuber (0–3) || Steckenrider (7) || 20,044 || 70–61 || W1
|- style="background:#fbb;"
| 132 || August 30 || Astros || 3–4 || Maton (4–0) || Smith (2–3) || Pressly (22) || 11,630 || 70–62 || L1
|- style="background:#bfb;"
| 133 || August 31 || Astros || 4–0 || Sewald (9–3) || Graveman (5–1) || — || 10,452 || 71–62 || W1
|-

|- style="background:#bfb;"
| 134 || September 1 || Astros || 1–0 || Sheffield (6–8) || Odorizzi (6–7) || Sewald (8) || 10,519 || 72–62 || W2
|- style="background:#bfb;"
| 135 || September 3 || @ Diamondbacks || 6–5  || Sheffield (7–8) || Clarke (1–2) || Ramírez (2) || 12,729 || 73–62 || W3
|- style="background:#bfb;"
| 136 || September 4 || @ Diamondbacks || 8–5 || Gonzales (7–5) || Smith (4–9) || Castillo (16) || 18,819 || 74–62 || W4
|- style="background:#bfb;"
| 137 || September 5 || @ Diamondbacks || 10–4  || Ramírez (1–2) || Clarke (1–3) || — || 14,408 || 75–62 || W5
|- style="background:#fbb;"
| 138 || September 6 || @ Astros || 2–11 || McCullers Jr. (11–4) || Kikuchi (7–8) || Bielak (1) || 25,802 || 75–63 || L1
|- style="background:#fbb;"
| 139 || September 7 || @ Astros || 4–5  || Stanek (2–4) || Ramírez (1–3) || — || 20,353 || 75–64 || L2
|- style="background:#bfb;"
| 140 || September 8 || @ Astros || 8–5 || Castillo (3–5) || Pressly (5–2) || — || 19,089 || 76–64 || W1
|- style="background:#bfb;"
| 141 || September 10 || Diamondbacks || 5–4 || Gonzales (8–5) || Bumgarner (7–10) || Steckenrider (8) || 14,379 || 77–64 || W2
|- style="background:#fbb;"
| 142 || September 11 || Diamondbacks || 3–7 || Castellanos (2–1) || Flexen (11–6) || — || 15,483 || 77–65 || L1
|- style="background:#fbb;"
| 143 || September 12 || Diamondbacks || 4–5 || Gilbert (2–2) || Misiewicz (4–5) || Wendelken (1) || 13,551 || 77–66 || L2
|- style="background:#bfb;"
| 144 || September 13 || Red Sox || 5–4 || Castillo (4–5) || Brasier (0–1) || Steckenrider (9) || 18,219 || 78–66 || W1
|- style="background:#fbb;"
| 145 || September 14 || Red Sox || 4–8 || Ottavino (6–3) || Smith (2–4) || — || 19,887 || 78–67 || L1
|- style="background:#fbb;"
| 146 || September 15 || Red Sox || 4–9  || Ottavino (7–3) || Swanson (0–3) || — || 17,860 || 78–68 || L2
|- style="background:#bfb;"
| 147 || September 17 || @ Royals || 6–2 || Flexen (12–6) || Heasley (0–1) || — || 14,904 || 79–68 || W1
|- style="background:#fbb;"
| 148 || September 18 || @ Royals || 1–8 || Bubic (5–6) || Kikuchi (7–9) || — || 20,085 || 79–69 || L1
|- style="background:#bfb;"
| 149 || September 19 || @ Royals || 7–1 || Gilbert (6–5) || Kowar (0–4) || — || 16,872 || 80–69 || W1
|- style="background:#bfb;"
| 150 || September 20 || @ Athletics || 4–2 || Anderson (7–9) || Manaea (10–10) || Sewald (9) || 4,068 || 81–69 || W2
|- style="background:#bfb;"
| 151 || September 21 || @ Athletics || 5–2 || Gonzales (9–5) || Blackburn (1–3) || Steckenrider (10) || 4,246 || 82–69 || W3
|- style="background:#bfb;"
| 152 || September 22 || @ Athletics || 4–1 || Flexen (13–6) || Irvin (10–14) || Steckenrider (11) || 4,149 || 83–69 || W4
|- style="background:#bfb;"
| 153 || September 23 || @ Athletics || 6–5 || Smith (3–4) || Diekman (3–3) || Sewald (10) || 4,966 || 84–69 || W5
|- style="background:#bfb;"
| 154 || September 24 || @ Angels || 6–5 || Smith (4–4) || Herget (2–2) || Sewald (11) || 18,551 || 85–69 || W6
|- style="background:#fbb;"
| 155 || September 25 || @ Angels || 1–14 || Díaz (1–0) || Anderson (7–10) || — || 30,221 || 85–70 || L1
|- style="background:#bfb;"
| 156 || September 26 || @ Angels || 5–1 || Gonzales (10–5) || Quijada (0–2) || — || 22,057 || 86–70 || W1
|- style="background:#bfb;"
| 157 || September 27 || Athletics || 13–4 || Flexen (14–6) || Irvin (10–15) || — || 11,169 || 87–70 || W2
|- style="background:#bfb;"
| 158 || September 28 || Athletics || 4–2 || Misiewicz (5–5) || Petit (8–3) || Steckenrider (12) || 12,635 || 88–70 || W3
|- style="background:#bfb;"
| 159 || September 29 || Athletics || 4–2 || Castillo (5–5) || Chafin (2–4) || Steckenrider (13) || 17,366 || 89–70 || W4
|-

|- style="background:#fbb;"
| 160 || October 1 || Angels || 1–2 || Suárez (8–8) || Gonzales (10–6) || Iglesias (34) || 44,169 || 89–71 || L1
|- style="background:#bfb;"
| 161 || October 2 || Angels || 6–4 || Sewald (10–3) || Cishek (0–2) || Steckenrider (14) || 44,414 || 90–71 || W1
|- style="background:#fbb;" 
| 162 || October 3 || Angels || 3–7 || Ortega (1–1) || Anderson (7–11) || — || 44,229 || 90–72 || L1
|-

|- style="text-align:center;"
| Legend:       = Win       = Loss       = PostponementBold = Mariners team member

Roster

Statistics

Batting
Stats in bold are the team leaders.

Note: G = Games played; AB = At bats; R = Runs; H = Hits; 2B = Doubles; 3B = Triples; HR = Home runs; RBI = Runs batted in; SB = Stolen bases; BB = Walks; AVG = Batting average; TB = Total bases

Pitching
Stats in bold are the team leaders.

Note: W = Wins; L = Losses; ERA = Earned run average; G = Games pitched; GS = Games started; SV = Saves; IP = Innings pitched; R = Runs allowed; ER = Earned runs allowed; BB = Walks allowed; K = Strikeouts

Farm system

References

External links

2021 Seattle Mariners season at Baseball Reference

Seattle Mariners seasons
Seattle Mariners season
Seattle Mariners
Seattle Mariners